Mashhad-e Morghab District is a district (bakhsh) in Khorrambid County, Fars Province, Iran. At the 2006 census, its population was 17,673, in 4,250 families.  The district has one city, Qaderabad, and one rural district (dehestan), Shahidabad Rural District.

References 

Khorrambid County
Districts of Fars Province